To Your Good Health! is a Russian fairy tale.  Andrew Lang included it in The Crimson Fairy Book.

Synopsis

Everyone in a king's country had to say "To your good health!" whenever he sneezed, but a shepherd with the staring eyes would not say it. The king summoned him and demanded it, but the shepherd would only say, "To my good health."  The chamberlain told him he would be killed if he did not, and the shepherd said that he would say it only if he married the princess.  The princess thought him handsome enough to marry, but the king was enraged.  He had the shepherd thrown in the white bear's pit, but the shepherd's eyes scared it off.  Then he had him thrown into a pit of wild boars, but the shepherd played a pipe and made them dance, so they did not harm him.  Then he was to have him thrown into a well of scythes, but the shepherd told the guard to give him a minute to look down the well, he might decide to say it after all, and in that minute, he whipped up a dummy that the soldier threw down instead of him.  

Then the king offered him a silver wood, a golden castle, and a diamond lake to say it, but the shepherd still said he would say it only he had the princess to wife.  The king married him to the princess.  At the wedding feast, he sneezed, and the shepherd said, first of all, "To your good health!" which so delighted the king that he did not mind the marriage.

In time, the shepherd succeeded the king.  He did not order his people to wish him well against their wills, but everyone did wish him well because he was a good king.

External links
To your Good Health!

Russian fairy tales